Radoslav Kirilov Kirilov (born 29 June 1992) is a Bulgarian professional footballer who plays as a winger for  CSKA 1948.

Kirilov was signed by Serie A club ChievoVerona from Rimini in 2010, but was unable to break into the first team and spent time on loan with Lumezzane, Carpi, Venezia, Cremonese, Südtirol,  Beroe and Pirin Blagoevgrad, before joining Vis Pesaro permanently after his release by Chievo in June 2018. He then joined Slavia Sofia in January 2019.

After representing Bulgaria at under-19 and under-21 levels, Kirilov made his senior international debut against Belarus in November 2016.

Career

Rimini
In 2009–10 season, Kirilov earned 7 appearances for Rimini Calcio in the Lega Pro Prima Divisione.

Chievo and loans
Kirilov signed for Chievo Verona in July 2010, on free transfer. In 2010–11 season, he scored eight goals in 25 appearances for the under-20s team in the Campionato Nazionale Primavera. Kirilov made his first team debut in a 2–0 2010–11 Coppa Italia win over Sassuolo Calcio on 28 October 2010, coming on as a substitute for Davide Moscardelli.

On 11 July 2012, Kirilov joined A.C. Lumezzane on a 1-year loan deal.

On 10 July 2014 he was signed by U.S. Cremonese on loan for a season.

On 10 June 2016 Kirilov returned to Bulgaria, signing a year long loan with Beroe Stara Zagora. On 21 July 2017, he was loaned for a further year to another Bulgarian club, Pirin Blagoevgrad.

Slavia Sofia
In January 2019 Kirilov joined Slavia Sofia.

Career statistics

International career 
Kirilov made his first UEFA European Under-19 Championship qualifying round appearance for the Bulgaria under-19 side on 7 October 2009 in a 1–1 draw against Northern Ireland. He earned his first cap for the senior national team on 13 November 2016, coming on as a second-half substitute in the 1:0 win over Belarus in a 2018 World Cup qualifier.

Scores and results list Bulgaria's goal tally first, score column indicates score after each Kirilov goal.

References

External links

1992 births
Living people
Bulgarian footballers
Bulgaria youth international footballers
Bulgaria under-21 international footballers
Bulgaria international footballers
Association football midfielders
Association football forwards
Rimini F.C. 1912 players
A.C. ChievoVerona players
F.C. Lumezzane V.G.Z. A.S.D. players
A.C. Carpi players
Venezia F.C. players
U.S. Cremonese players
F.C. Südtirol players
PFC Beroe Stara Zagora players
OFC Pirin Blagoevgrad players
PFC Slavia Sofia players
Serie B players
Serie C players
First Professional Football League (Bulgaria) players
Bulgarian expatriate footballers
Bulgarian expatriate sportspeople in Italy
Expatriate footballers in Italy